Jon Dumbrill (born 9 April 1935) is a South African cricketer. He played in twenty first-class matches from 1956/57 to 1965/66.

References

External links
 

1935 births
Living people
South African cricketers
Eastern Province cricketers
Western Province cricketers
Cricketers from Greater London